The 2008 World Group II Play-offs were four ties which involved the losing nations of the World Group II and four nations from the three Zonal Group I competitions. Nations that won their play-off ties entered the 2009 World Group II, while losing nations joined their respective zonal groups.

Croatia vs. Serbia

Slovakia vs. Uzbekistan

Belgium vs. Colombia

Austria vs. Switzerland

References

See also
Fed Cup structure

World Group II Play-offs